Shannon Shelmire Wynne (born December 2, 1951) is an American restaurateur living in Dallas, TX. Wynne currently co-owns and operates restaurants in six states and 14 cities, including The Flying Saucers in Texas, North Carolina, South Carolina, Tennessee, Arkansas and Missouri; The Flying Fish in Texas, Tennessee, and Arkansas; Rodeo Goat in Dallas and Fort Worth, Texas; and Mudhen Meat and Greens, The Meddlesome Moth and LARK on the Park  in Dallas.

Early life and family 

The Wynne family is deeply rooted in Dallas, Wills Point, and Austin, Texas. Wynne was born in 1951 in Dallas, Texas.

He is the son of Joann (née Ebeling) and Angus Gilchrist Wynne Jr. His father was a developer in the postwar housing boom when he was president of the American Home Realty Company, developers of Wynnewood Village in the Oak Cliff section of Dallas. At the time, it was the largest real estate development of its kind in the country. Along with real estate, Wynne Jr. was involved in the amusement park business and founded the Great Southwest Corporation, Six Flags Over Texas, Six Flags over Georgia, and Six Flags over Mid-America.

Wynne is the grandson of Nemo Shelmire Wynne and Angus Gilchrist Wynne Sr., an East Texas lawyer who was prominent in Democratic Party politics and was the first president of the State Bar of Texas.

Wynne is the great grandson of William Benjamin "Buck" Wynne, an eminent Dallas lawyer, and Margaret Henderson Wynne.

On his paternal grandmother’s side, he is the great grandson of Dr. Jesse Bedford Shelmire, a distinguished and pioneer dermatologist who was the first in the Southwest to be honored with membership in the American Dermatological Association, and served as the chair of dermatology at Baylor University College of Medicine, which he held until his retirement in 1927.

Wynne has two older brothers, Angus Gilchrist Wynne III and David Ebeling Wynne, and one sister, Mary Temple Wynne.

Professional life

Early career and 8.0 
Wynne began his career as a restaurateur in 1980. After his favorite bar in Dallas, the Stoneleigh P, burned down, Wynne and a group of friends and investors brought together their resources and opened 8.0 Bar ("Eight-Oh"). 8.0 lit up the Dallas nightclub scene and, over the next three years, Wynne opened a string of O-clubs and restaurants across Dallas including Nostromo, The Rio Room, Rocco Oyster Bar, Mexico, and Tango(where Count Basie played opening night).

By 1982, the "O" restaurants and venues were what was happening in Dallas. Wynne's Nostromo was a popular, yet signless, restaurant. It spawned The Rio Room, located in the back of Nostromo.

Wynne ventured into casual dining with the opening of a Tex-Mex Mexican restaurant, Mexico, and an Italian restaurant, Palermo. Wynne's popular Rocco Oyster Bar was known for its fresh seafood, New Orleans standards juke box and white tile setting.

James Brown, Lisa Loeb, Joe King Carrasco and Tina Turner on her comeback could be found playing at Tango, with Bob "Daddy-O" Wade's 'Six Frogs Over Greenville' on top of the building where, inside the former bank building, there was plenty of room to dance.

In 1994, Wynne designed and opened 8.0 Bar in Sundance Square in Fort Worth, Texas.

Flying Saucer Draught Emporium 
In 1995, Wynne designed and opened the first Flying Saucer Draught Emporium in Sundance Square with Keith Schlabs. The restaurant included an extensive beer selection, with hundreds of options in bottles and over 80 quality hand-crafted beers on tap. The Flying Saucer now has three location in the DFW metroplex as well as other units including Austin, San Antonio, Houston, Lake Ray Hubbard and Sugarland; Little Rock, Arkansas; Memphis, Tennessee; Cordova, Tennessee; Charlotte, North Carolina; and Raleigh, North Carolina.

As of 2015, Robert Wynne (no relation) was the first and only person to earn a plate at every Flying Saucer location.

In May 2012 the Fort Worth 8.0 on Sundance Square was closed to make way for The Flying Saucer Draught Emporium and Bird Cafe.

Flying Fish 
In 2002, Wynne designed and opened the first Flying Fish, a casual seafood restaurant, in Little Rock, Arkansas. The Flying Fish serves catfish, shrimp, oysters, crawfish and other seafood. Wynne expanded the restaurant throughout North Texas with locations in Addison, Dallas: Irving Blvd., Dallas: Preston Center, Garland, Fort Worth, Arlington, Plano, Garland: Firewheel, and Houston. There is also a location in Memphis, Tennessee.

Meddlesome Moth and Moth Management 
In 2010, Wynne designed and opened Meddlesome Moth, a gastro pub with a tap room and a chef driven menu. The restaurant, the first to be located in the Dallas Design District, offers an extensive beer selection with a rare cask tapped weekly. The Moth features art works by James Surls, Frank Tolbert, Dmitri Vail and many others.

In 2013, Wynne designed and opened LARK on the Park overlooking Klyde Warren Park in Dallas, TX.

Philanthropy 

Wynne is currently on the board of The Bridge Homeless Recovery Center. He has also served on the board of the North Texas Food Bank and KERA radio in Dallas. He co-founded Preservation Park Cities, now called Park Cities Historical and Preservation Society since merging with the Park Cities Historical Society. Wynne co-founded the David Dike Art Auction with Texas art expert David Dike. Wynne currently serves on the Board of the Lone Star Film Festival in Fort Worth, Texas.

A friend of the arts, Wynne collects works by Texas artists, with a particular interest in works from "The Dallas Nine," a group of painters, printmakers, and sculptors active in Dallas during the Works Progress Administration (W.P.A.).

Wynne also collects the works of many current artists including David Bates, Bill Haveron, James Surls and many others.

Personal life 
From his first marriage to Patti Jo née Oldham, Wynne has a son, Shannon Shelmire “Sam” Wynne Jr. (born 1984). Patti was the daughter of Philadelphia reporter Jim O'Brien and is the sister of actress Peri Gilpin, well known for her role as Roz Doyle in Frasier.

From his marriage to Brycie Sue Hoecker, Shannon is the father of triplets, Isabella "Bella" Mae McCarty Wynne, Bowie Hoecker Wynne and Angus Augustus Wynne (born 1996).

Wynne is married to Kimberly Claire Daulton (dating 1999, wed August 14, 2010) and has two step daughters; Raynor Elizabeth B. (born 1989) and Wynonah "Wynn" Claire B. (born 1991).

References 

1951 births
Living people
American restaurateurs